Karl Holdhaus (21 January 1883, in Baden bei Wien – 30 June 1975) was an Austrian entomologist who specialised in Coleoptera. 
He was Director of the Vienna Natural History Museum.
 
Holdhaus worked on the Coleoptera of glacial refugia, postglacial range expansions and “Massifs de Refugium”. He recognised that the distribution of blind euedaphic and troglobitic beetles was restricted to a well defined area in Europe, south of a line connecting Bordeaux, Lyon, the southern Alps, the Carpathians and the Black Sea. This is the  “Holdhaus line” - the northern distribution limit of beetles with very poor powers of dispersal, especially blind cave beetles. Only two small areas with blind beetles occur north of this line the Jura and the Northeastern Alps). Also South of this line there are many endemic animals and these areas are the “Massifs de Refugium” of  Chodat & Pampanini (1902).

Selected works

1920 Koleopteren aus Mesopotamien. Ann. Naturh. Mus. Wien, 33 (1919): 39-58.
1923 Elenco dei Coleotteri dell'isola d' Elba, con studii suI problemo della Tirennida. Mem. Soc. ent. ital., 2, 1: 76-112, 2: 113-176.
with Carl. H. Lindroth, 1940. Die europäischen Koleopteren mit boreoalpiner Verbreitung. Ann. Nat. Mus. Wien 50: 123-293.
1954 Die Spuren der Eiszeit in der Tierwelt Europas. Abh. zool.-bot. Ges., 18: 1-493.
Also in book form as Die Spuren der Eiszeit in der Tierwelt Europas. 1-493. Wagner, Innsbruck.(same year)

with Deubel F. 1910.Untersuchungen über die Zoogeographie der Karpathen (unter besonderer Berucksichtigung der Coleopteren). Abh. zool.-bot. Ges. Wien, 6, 1: 1-202.

Collection
Holdhaus' collection is  Vienna Natural History Museum.

References
Franz, H. 1976: [Holdhaus, K.] Verh. Zool.-Bot. Ges. Wien 115 16-20
Janczyk, F. 1978: [Holdhaus, K.] Ann. Naturhist. Mus. Wien 81 1977 651-655
Lindroth, C. H. 1977: [Holdhaus, K.]  Ent. Tidskr. 98 29-30
Nonveiller, G. 1999: The Pioneers of the research on the Insects of Dalmatia.  Zagreb, Hrvatski Pridodoslovni Muzej.

Austrian entomologists
1883 births
1975 deaths
Scientists from Baden bei Wien
20th-century Austrian zoologists